Seoul Nowon United FC (Korean: 서울 노원 유나이티드 FC) (formerly known as Seoul United FC) is a South Korean semi-professional football club based in Nowon District, Seoul. It currently competes in the fourth tier of the South Korean football league system, the K4 League. Until 2018, the club was named Seoul United FC.

History

Founding
The movement to create Seoul United FC began in 2001, with Michael Atkinson and a group of supporters setting about bringing professional football back to the city of Seoul, following the K League's decision to relocate the then-capital clubs to other cities.

The movement suffered a setback at the end of 2003 when LG moved their Anyang LG Cheetahs club from Anyang to Seoul, becoming FC Seoul and taking up residence at the Seoul World Cup Stadium.

Despite this, the fan push continued and the establishment of the K3 League in 2007 gave a realistic opportunity for involvement in the league set-up. Two amateur sides, Good Bu&Bu (Good Friend) and Youngseo FC (Jin Seoul), were merged to create the new club and the home venue of Seoul Olympic Stadium was chosen. For the 2010 season the team moved to Hyochang Stadium in Yongsan-gu, Seoul. In 2011 the team relocated again to the smaller Nowon Madeul Stadium in Nowon District, Seoul.

Entry into the league system
The club's first ever match was played on April 21, 2007, a 2–2 home draw with Changwon Dudae FC.

The inaugural K3-League season ended with the club clinching the first ever K3 League title after a 3–0 aggregate victory over Hwasung Sinwoo Electronics in the championship playoffs.

Managerial history
In the closing weeks of 2014 it was announced that Choi Sang-kook would take over as the ninth manager of the club.

Current squad

Honours
K3 League
Winners (1): 2007

Season-by-season records

References

External links
Seoul Nowon United FC official Facebook

 
Sport in Seoul
K3 League (2007–2019) clubs
K4 League clubs
Football clubs in Seoul
Association football clubs established in 2007
2007 establishments in South Korea